SEK or Sek may refer to:

Organisations
 Federation of Swiss Protestant Churches (Schweizerischer Evangelischer Kirchenbund)
 SEK Studio, a North Korean animation studio
 Stagecoach in East Kent, a transportation company in England
 SEK (Germany) (Spezialeinsatzkommando), police tactical units of the German state police forces
 Hellenic State Railways (Sidirodromoi Ellinikou Kratous), a former Greek public sector entity
 Socialist Workers Party (Greece) (Sosialistikó Ergatikó Kómma), a Greek political party
 Swedish Export Credit Corporation  (Svensk Exportkredit)

People
 Sek Henry,  professional basketball player, 2018 Israeli Basketball Premier League MVP
 Samuel Edward Konkin III, known as SEK III

Other uses
 Swedish krona (ISO 4217 currency code), the currency of Sweden
 Sehk or Sek, a village in South Khorasan Province, Iran
 Sewer Evil King, a fictional character in Okage: Shadow King